Kurt Rechsteiner (8 January 1931 – 2017) was a Swiss cyclist. He competed in the sprint event at the 1960 Summer Olympics.

References

External links
 

1931 births
2017 deaths
Swiss male cyclists
Olympic cyclists of Switzerland
Cyclists at the 1960 Summer Olympics
People from Appenzell Ausserrhoden